Lanatonectria is a genus of fungi in the family Nectriaceae.

External links

Nectriaceae genera